Phineas Baldwin (December 4, 1824 – April 25, 1901) was a member of the Wisconsin State Assembly.

Biography
Baldwin was born on December 4, 1824 in Orford, Canada West. In 1846, he married Mehitable Young. She died in 1853. Baldwin arrived in Dane County, Wisconsin in 1854, where he became a farmer. The following year, he married Eliza M. Montgomery. He died at his home in Brooklyn, Wisconsin in 1901.

Political career
Baldwin was a member of the Assembly during the 1872 and 1877 sessions. In 1873 he was the Republican candidate for the Senate's 26th District, losing to incumbent Romanzo E. Davis (a former Republican who had become a Liberal Republican. In 1874, he had been an unsuccessful candidate, losing to incumbent Michael Johnson. Other positions Baldwin held include chairman (similar to Mayor) and member of the Town Board of Oregon (town), Wisconsin, alderman of Madison, Wisconsin, member and Chairman of the Dane County Board of Supervisors and Sheriff of Dane County. He was a Republican.

References

External links

People from Chatham-Kent
Pre-Confederation Ontario people
Politicians from Madison, Wisconsin
Republican Party members of the Wisconsin State Assembly
Mayors of places in Wisconsin
Wisconsin city council members
County supervisors in Wisconsin
Wisconsin sheriffs
Farmers from Wisconsin
1824 births
1901 deaths
People from Oregon, Wisconsin
19th-century American politicians